Mazurek (archaic feminine Mazurkowa for "wife"; Mazurkówna for "daughter of Mr. Mazurek"; Mazurkowie for plural) is one of the most common surnames in Poland and the 2nd most popular in Lublin Land (9,644). It is uncommon as a given name. People with the name include:

People
 Beata Mazurek (born 1967), Polish politician
 Franco Mazurek (born 1993), Argentine football player
 Fred Mazurek (born 1943), American football player
 Joseph P. Mazurek (1948-2012), Former Montana Attorney General
 Marta Mazurek (born 1990), Polish film actress
 Rob Mazurek (born 1965), American jazz musician
 Robert Mazurek (journalist) (born 1971), Polish journalist
 Zuzanna Mazurek (born 1991), Polish swimmer

See also
 
 Mazur (surname)
 Masur (surname)
 Mazurski, Mazursky
 Mazurka

Polish-language surnames
Ethnonymic surnames
pl:Mazurek